The Cians is a mountain river that flows through the Alpes-Maritimes department of southeastern France. Its source is in the mountains north of Beuil, and it flows into the Var in Touët-sur-Var.

 The Cians flows through the following communes:
 Beuil, Rigaud, Pierlas, Thiéry, Touët-sur-Var.

This river runs through a canyon of red shale, named "Gorges du Cians", with formations of eroded rock.

Tributaries
 Raton
 Cianavelle

References

Rivers of France
Rivers of Alpes-Maritimes
Rivers of Provence-Alpes-Côte d'Azur